Ellinger is a rural unincorporated community in Fayette County, Texas, United States. It may also refer to:

People
Bruno Ellinger (born 1973), Austrian ice dancer
John Ellinger (born 1951), American soccer coach
Moritz Ellinger (1830–1907), German-American journalist and city official
Nina Bang, née Ellinger, (1866–1928), Danish politician
Rory Ellinger (1941–2014), American politician
Meatball (wrestler) or Richard Ellinger (born 1970), American professional wrestler

See also
Ellinger, Texas, an unincorporated community, Texas, United States
Ellinger Tor, a Ccty gate of Weißenburg, Bayern, Germany